Tokko's original soundtrack was released in stores across Japan on June 28, 2006 as part of its release with the TOKKO TV series. This does not include the opening and ending themes. Artists such as No Milk, Nude Jazz, Aoki Takamasa, Heprcam, DJ Baku, Numb, Koji Sekiguchi, and Danchambo collaborated to create the soundtrack album.

Track listing
 Mysterious People
 Cannibal-Danchzma
 集合的無意識　
 Candle
 Chase in the Acid City
 Kakusei
 Outformation
 Mind Controller
 Dark Corridor
 Elm
 Hope which isn't seen yet.

External links
 Universal Music Japan's Tokko OST website

Anime soundtracks
2006 soundtrack albums